Melancolia e Carnaval (Portuguese for "Melancholy and Carnival") is the eleventh studio album by the Brazilian musician Rogério Skylab; the second installment of what he calls the "Trilogia dos Carnavais" (Trilogy of the Carnivals). It was self-released in 2014, and counts with guest appearances by musicians  and Jards Macalé, and by the Estação Primeira de Mangueira samba school.

"Cogito" is a poem by Torquato Neto set to music by Skylab. "Palavras São Voláteis" is a re-recording of the song originally present in Fora da Grei. "Hino Americano", as evidenced by the title, is sung to the tune of the national anthem of the United States, "The Star-Spangled Banner". A music video was made for the track.

The album can be downloaded for free on Skylab's official website.

Critical reception
Melancolia e Carnaval has received positive reviews since its release. Mauro Ferreira of blog Notas Musicais gave it 3.5 stars out of 5, stating that the album "balances the traditional and the unusual" and that it is "beautifully strange". Rafael Sartori of Território da Música called the album "surprising", "coherent" and "simplistic in a good way", giving it 3 stars out of 5. Raul Lima de Albuquerque of Coliseu de Ideias spoke favorably of the album, calling it "tasteful and subtle". He proceeded to give the album a rating of 8 out of 10.

In late December 2014, website UOL set up a public poll asking readers to vote on the best albums of the year; Melancolia e Carnaval was featured in first place in the "MPB" category.

Track listing

Personnel
 Rogério Skylab – vocals, production
 Alexandre Guichard – classical guitar
 Luiz Antônio Gomes – classical guitar (track 7), bass guitar, keyboards, mixing, mastering
 Jards Macalé – additional vocals, classical guitar (track 5)
  – additional vocals (track 1)
 Velha Guarda da Mangueira – additional vocals (track 11)
 Bruno Coelho – drums, percussion
 Thiago Martins – electric guitar
 Samuel Ramos – trombone (track 7)
 Solange Venturi – cover art

References

2014 albums
Rogério Skylab albums
Self-released albums
Sequel albums
Obscenity controversies in music
Albums free for download by copyright owner